Lanelater mastersii is a species of click beetle belonging to the family Elateridae.

Description
The body is dark brown or black, while antennae are reddish. Prothorax is longer than the width, the sides are lightly rounded and the posterior angles are divergent and prolonged backwards. Elytra are as broad as the thorax at the base, lightly sinuate and gradually narrowed, rounded at the apex. Each elytron shows eight deep and distinctly punctured striae. This click beetle is a predator on scarab larvae.

Distribution
This species can be found in north-east Australia.

References
 Biolib
 Atlas of living Australia
 Discover Life
 Synopsis of the described coleoptera of the world
 The transactions of the Entomological Society of New South Wales

Elateridae
Beetles described in 1872